In Turkic mythology, Hortdan (Azerbaijani: Xortdan, Turkish: Hortlak, Tuvan: Хортан) is the troubled soul of the dead rising from the grave. Some Hortdan can be living people with certain magical properties. Some of the properties of the Hortdan include: the ability to transform into an animal, invisibility, and the propensity to drain the vitality of victims via blood loss. Hortdans are also known as immortal vampires.

Origin
The Hortdans are creatures of Azerbaijani mythology, as a representation of evil spirits, the spirits of the dead. As these stories were transmitted only by oral tradition, legend has lost its original substance, and Azerbaijani people have transformed Xortdan into bloodthirsty creatures.

Hortdans are fictional undead creatures regularly encountered in horror and fantasy themed narratives. They are typically depicted as mindless, reanimated corpses with a hunger for human flesh.

Etymology
The name Hortdan (or Hortlak) is related to the Turkic verb hortlamak, which in Turkish  means get out and especially get out of the grave.

Different types of Hortdan
 Hortlak is the name of this creature in Turkish culture. And refers to a Zombie-like entity. 
 Xortdan is in Azerbaijani folklore same of vampire.
 Hortan (sometimes Аза-Хортан "Aza-Hortan") is a poltergeist like an evil spirit in Tuva tradition.

References

External links 
 Türk Mitoloji Sözlüğü, Pınar Karaca (Hortlak)
 Tatar Mitolojisinde Varlıklar, Çulpan Zaripova (Hortlak)
 Rize ve Yöresinde Eski Türk İnançları, Yaşar Kalafat
 Dinan-ı Lügat-it Türk'te Yer Alan Efsaneler, Behiye Köksel

Ghosts
Turkic demons
Zombies
Mythological hematophages
Vampires
Undead